Azuay, Province of Azuay is a province of Ecuador, created on 25 June 1824. Its capital is Cuenca. It is located in the south center of Ecuador in the highlands.

Azuay is located on the Panamerican Highway. Cuenca is connected by national flights from Quito and Guayaquil. It has the largest hydroelectric plant of the country, situated on the river Paute.

Demographics 
Ethnic groups as of the Ecuadorian census of 2010:
 Mestizo  90%
 White  5.2%
 Indigenous  2.5%
 Afro-Ecuadorian  2.2%
 Other  0.2%

Cantons 
The province is divided into 15 cantons. The following table lists each with its population at the 2010 census, its area in square kilometres (km2), and the name of the canton seat or capital.

See also 
 Provinces of Ecuador
 Cantons of Ecuador

References

External links 

 Provincial Prefecture's Official Page
 Ubicacuenca.com - Map - Complete Guide of Azuay, Ecuador

 
Provinces of Ecuador
States and territories established in 1824